The Rainmaker is a 1997 American legal drama film written and directed by Francis Ford Coppola based on John Grisham's 1995 novel of the same title. It stars Matt Damon, Claire Danes, Jon Voight, Mary Kay Place, Mickey Rourke, Danny DeVito, Danny Glover, Roy Scheider, Virginia Madsen, and Teresa Wright in her final film role.

Plot
Unlike most of his fellow graduates of the University of Memphis Law School, Rudy Baylor has no high-paying job lined up and has to apply for part-time positions while serving drinks at a Memphis bar. Desperate for a job, he meets the bar's owner, J. Lyman "Bruiser" Stone, who is also a ruthless but successful ambulance chaser, who hires Rudy as an associate.

To get paid by Bruiser, associates pay their way by finding cases and working them up for trial. Rudy responds saying he has cases, including an insurance bad faith matter he boasts could be worth several million in damages. Interested in the case, Bruiser introduces Rudy to office paralegal Deck Shifflet, a former insurance adjuster of questionable ethics.

While showing Rudy around the office Deck tells him he failed the bar exam six times. However, Bruiser employs him because he is resourceful, finds cases, is adept at gathering information, and because his prior work experience in the insurance industry means he knows how to go after them.

Though Rudy has passed the Tennessee bar exam, he still has not been properly licensed to stand as an attorney.  He tries to do so after Bruiser fails to show up before Judge Harvey Hale to argue the case, but Hale scolds Rudy and tells him to get his license and then come back.  Defense attorney Leo F. Drummond offers to stand for Rudy as Rudy is sworn in before the judge.  Afterwards, Rudy discovers that the FBI has raided Stone's office, and Stone is nowhere to be found.

Using $5,500 that Bruiser had given each of them shortly before fleeing, Rudy and Deck pool their money together and set up a practice themselves. They file suit for middle-aged couple Dot and Buddy Black, whose 22-year-old son, Donny Ray, is dying of leukemia, but could have been saved with a bone marrow transplant, denied by their insurance carrier Great Benefit.

Rudy, having never argued a case before a judge and jury, now faces a group of experienced lawyers led by Drummond, from the prestigious firm Tinley Britt.    In chambers, Hale tells Rudy and Drummond that he is set to dismiss the case because he sees it as a "lottery" case that slows down the judicial process. However, Hale dies of a heart attack before he grants the petition for dismissal.  The more sympathetic Tyrone Kipler, a former civil rights attorney, is appointed to replace Hale.  Kipler, known by Deck as not liking Tinley Britt, immediately denies Great Benefit's petition for dismissal.  He instead agrees to fast-track the case in order to record Donny Ray Black's testimony before he dies.

While seeking new clients, Rudy meets Kelly Riker, a battered wife whose husband Cliff has beaten her numerous times, repeatedly putting her in the hospital. Rudy strikes up a friendship with her and persuades her to file for divorce.  This leads to a bloody confrontation with Cliff, resulting in Rudy nearly beating him to death. To keep Rudy from being implicated, Kelly tells Rudy to leave. She then kills Cliff herself, then tells the police it was self-defense. The district attorney declines to prosecute.

Donny Ray dies days after giving a video deposition at his home. The case goes to trial, where Drummond gets the vital testimony of Rudy's key witness, Jackie Lemanczyk, stricken from the record as it is based on a stolen manual used as evidence. Nevertheless, thanks to Rudy's determination and some clandestine reference help from now Caribbean-based fugitive Bruiser (with whom Deck is connected by intermediaries), Jackie's testimony and the Great Benefit Employee Manual are finally admitted into evidence, to Drummond's dismay.

Rudy skillfully cross-examines Great Benefit's CEO, Wilfred Keeley, leading to the jury finding for Donny Ray's family for both actual damages and enormous punitive damages that Great Benefit cannot pay. It is a great triumph for Rudy and Deck, with Keeley being arrested by the FBI and investigation proceedings into Great Benefit launched in multiple jurisdictions. The insurance company declares bankruptcy, allowing it to avoid paying punitive damages. There is no payout for the grieving parents and no fee for Rudy.

As this success will create unrealistic expectations for future clients, Rudy decides to abandon his new practice and teach law. He and Kelly leave town together, heading out for an uncertain, but bright, future together.

Cast

 Matt Damon as Rudy Baylor
 Danny DeVito as Deck Shifflet
 Claire Danes as Kelly Riker
 Jon Voight as Leo F. Drummond
 Mary Kay Place as Dot Black
 Dean Stockwell as Judge Harvey Hale
 Teresa Wright as "Miss Birdie" Birdsong
 Virginia Madsen as Jackie Lemanczyk
 Mickey Rourke as J. Lyman "Bruiser" Stone
 Andrew Shue as Cliff Riker
 Red West as Buddy Black
 Johnny Whitworth as Donny Ray Black
 Roy Scheider as Wilfred Keeley
 Randy Travis as Billy Porter
 Danny Glover (uncredited) as Judge Tyrone Kipler

Release

Box office
On its opening weekend, the film ranked third behind Anastasia and Mortal Kombat: Annihilation, earning $10,626,507. The film grossed $45,916,769 in the domestic box office, exceeding its estimated production budget of $40 million, but still was considered a disappointment for a film adaptation of a Grisham novel, particularly in comparison to The Firm, which was made for roughly the same amount but grossed more than six times its budget.

Critical reception
The film received generally positive reviews from critics, earning an 82% rating on Rotten Tomatoes based on 57 reviews, with an average rating of 6.90/10. The website's critical consensus states: "Invigorated by its talented cast and Francis Ford Coppola's strong direction, The Rainmaker is a satisfying legal drama — and arguably the best of Hollywood's many John Grisham adaptations." On Metacritic, the film has a 72 out of 100 rating based on 19 critics, indicating "generally positive reviews".

Roger Ebert gave The Rainmaker three stars out of four, remarking: "I have enjoyed several of the movies based on Grisham novels ... but I've usually seen the storyteller's craft rather than the novelist's art being reflected. ... By keeping all of the little people in focus, Coppola shows the variety of a young lawyer's life, where every client is necessary and most of them need a lot more than a lawyer." James Berardinelli also gave the film three stars out of four, saying that "the intelligence and subtlety of The Rainmaker took me by surprise" and that the film "stands above any other filmed Grisham adaptation".

Accolades
Nominations
Blockbuster Entertainment Awards
 Favorite Actor — Drama (Matt Damon)
 Favorite Supporting Actor — Drama (Danny DeVito)
 Favorite Supporting Actress — Drama (Claire Danes)
Golden Globe Awards
 Best Supporting Actor (Jon Voight)
NAACP Image Awards
 Best Supporting Actor — Motion Picture (Danny Glover)
Satellite Awards
 Best Supporting Actor — Motion Picture Drama (Danny DeVito)
USC Scripter Award
 USC Scripter Award (John Grisham and Francis Ford Coppola)

Other honors

The film is recognized by American Film Institute in these lists:
 2008: AFI's 10 Top 10:
 Nominated Courtroom Drama Film

References

External links

 
 
 
 
 

1997 films
1997 crime thriller films
1997 drama films
1997 thriller films
American crime thriller films
American legal drama films
American courtroom films
Films about lawyers
Films scored by Elmer Bernstein
Films based on works by John Grisham
Films directed by Francis Ford Coppola
Films set in Cleveland
Films set in Memphis, Tennessee
Films shot in Cleveland
Films about domestic violence
1990s legal films
Films with screenplays by Francis Ford Coppola
American Zoetrope films
Paramount Pictures films
Films produced by Michael Douglas
1990s English-language films
1990s American films